Itylos is a Neotropical butterfly genus in the family Lycaenidae. There has been confusion regarding the correct name; the present genus was discussed in 1945 by the famous lepidopterologist and author Vladimir Nabokov as Parachilades but had been described already in 1921. Nabokov used the name Itylos for the genus which nowadays is known as Madeleinea.

Species
 Itylos fumosus (Balletto, 1993) Peru
 Itylos mashenka Bálint, 1993 – named after Nabokov's first novel Mashen'ka (Mary)
 Itylos mira Bálint & Lamas, 1999 Peru
 Itylos pasco Bálint & Lamas, 1994 Peru
 Itylos pnin Bálint, 1993Peru
 Itylos titicaca (Weymer, 1890) Peru, Bolivia

References

Polyommatini
Lycaenidae of South America
Lycaenidae genera
Taxa named by Max Wilhelm Karl Draudt